Krustets is a village in Tryavna Municipality, in Gabrovo Province, in northern central Bulgaria. The long-distance Kom–Emine hiking trail passes by the village.

References

Villages in Gabrovo Province